Alessandra Olivari (born 29 November 1964) is a former Italian female long-distance runner and cross-country runner who competed at individual senior level at the World Athletics Cross Country Championships (1987).

She was 5th at the 1989 Summer Universiade – Women's marathon.

References

External links

 Alessandra Olivari at Association of Road Racing Statisticians

1964 births
Living people
Italian female middle-distance runners
Italian female cross country runners
Italian female marathon runners
Sportspeople from the Province of Genoa
People from Santa Margherita Ligure
20th-century Italian women
21st-century Italian women